Đông Hồ is a village in the Song Hồ commune, in Thuận Thành District, Bắc Ninh Province, Vietnam. It is one of several well known "craft villages", with the other most notable ones being Non Nước marble village and Cam Ne mat village in Da Nang, the Bát Tràng pottery village and Vạn Phúc silk village (also called ) near Hanoi, and the  Phước Kiều bronze casting village in Quảng Nam Province.

The village gives its name to Đông Hồ painting, a Vietnamese painting style from this village.

References

Populated places in Bắc Ninh province
vi:Đông Hồ (định hướng)